Bavan-e Sofla (also Romanized as Bavān-e Soflá; (also known as Bavān-e Pā‘īn, Bovān Pā‘īn, Bovan Pa`in and Bovān Pā‘īn) is a village in Bakesh-e Yek Rural District, in the Central District of Mamasani County, Fars Province, Iran. At the 2006 census, its population was 86, in 20 families.

References 

Populated places in Mamasani County